Makljenovac is a village in the municipalities of Doboj (Republika Srpska) and Usora, Bosnia and Herzegovina.

Demographics 
According to the 2013 census, its population was 1,571, with 1,210 living in the Doboj part, and 361 living in the Usora part

References

Villages in Republika Srpska
Populated places in Doboj
Populated places in Usora